The 6th Cavalry Brigade was a cavalry brigade of the British Army.  It served in the Napoleonic Wars (notably at the Battle of Waterloo), in the First World War on the Western Front where it was assigned to the 3rd Cavalry Division, and with the 1st Cavalry Division during the Second World War.

History

Napoleonic Wars
From June 1809, Wellington organized his cavalry into one, later two, cavalry divisions (1st and 2nd) for the Peninsular War.  These performed a purely administrative, rather than tactical, role; the normal tactical headquarters were provided by brigades commanding two, later usually three, regiments.  The cavalry brigades were named for the commanding officer, rather than numbered.  For the Hundred Days Campaign, he numbered his British cavalry brigades in a single sequence, 1st to 7th.  The 6th Cavalry Brigade consisted of:
10th (Prince of Wales's Own) Regiment of (Light) Dragoons (Hussars)
18th (King's Irish) Regiment of (Light) Dragoons (Hussars)
1st Hussars, King's German Legion
It was commanded by Major General Sir Hussey Vivian.

The brigade took part in the Battle of Waterloo.  During the battle, the 1st Hussars, KGL suffered just 7 casualties (1 killed, 6 wounded), the 10th Hussars 94 (22 killed, 46 wounded, 26 missing) and the 18th Hussars 102 (12 killed, 73 wounded, 17 missing).  This represented a loss rate of about 13%.

First World War

Formation
The brigade was formed on 19 September 1914 at Ludgershall, Wiltshire for the 3rd Cavalry Division.  It commanded three regular British Army cavalry regiments, the only ones not stationed in the United Kingdom or India at the outbreak of the war.  A Royal Engineers signal troop also joined on formation.

The 1st Dragoons joined the brigade on 19 September and the 10th Hussars on 22 September, both from Potchefstroom, South Africa.  The 3rd Dragoon Guards from the Force in Egypt did not join the brigade in Belgium until 4 November.

The brigade landed at Ostend on 8 October 1914 and deployed to the Western Front in France and Belgium.  C Battery, Royal Horse Artillery (six 13 pounders) joined the division's Royal Horse Artillery Brigade from XIV Brigade, RHA of 7th Division on 19 October and was permanently attached to 6th Cavalry Brigade on the same day.  On 29 February 1916, a Machine Gun Squadron was formed from the machine gun sections of the brigade's constituent regiments.

The 3rd Cavalry Division was initially formed with just two cavalry brigades – the 6th and 7th.  To bring the division up to the standard strength of three brigades, the 8th Cavalry Brigade was formed in Belgium on 20 November 1914.  The 10th Hussars was transferred to the new brigade on formation and was replaced by the 1/1st North Somerset Yeomanry from the 1st South Western Mounted Brigade in England.

Chronicle
The brigade served with the 3rd Cavalry Division on the Western Front until the end of the war.  In 1914, the division saw action in the defence of Antwerp (9 and 10 October) and the First Battle of Ypres, notably the battles of Langemarck (21–24 October), Gheluvelt (29–31 October) and Nonne Bosschen (11 November).  In 1915, it took part in the Second Battle of Ypres (Battle of Frezenberg Ridge, 11–13 May) and the Battle of Loos (26–28 September).  1916 saw no notable actions, but in 1917 the division saw action in the Battle of Arras (First Battle of the Scarpe, 9–12 April).  At other times, the brigade formed a dismounted unit and served in the trenches (as a regiment under the command of the brigadier).

1918 saw the return of the war of movement and the division took part in the First Battle of the Somme notably the Battle of St Quentin (21–23 March), Actions of the Somme Crossings (24 and 25 March) and Battle of the Avre (4 and 5 April); the Battle of Amiens and the battles of the Hindenburg Line (Battle of Cambrai, 8 and 9 October and the Pursuit to the Selle, 9–12 October).  Its final action was in the Advance in Flanders (9–11 November).

At the Armistice, units of the division had reached the River Dender at Leuze and Lessines in Belgium, when orders were received that they would cover the advance of the Second Army into Germany. They started the advance on 17 November, divisional headquarters being established at Waterloo on 21 November. Transport difficulties meant that the only one cavalry division could advance with Second Army so the following winter was spent in Belgium.  By 31 March 1919, the division was demobilized.

Order of battle

Second World War
The 6th Cavalry Brigade was a pre-war First Line Territorial Army cavalry brigade reformed in 1920.  On the outbreak of the war, it was part of Western Command and commanded the Warwickshire, Staffordshire and Cheshire Yeomanry regiments.  It joined the 1st Cavalry Division when it was formed on 31 October 1939.

With the 1st Cavalry Division, the 6th Cavalry Brigade departed the United Kingdom in December 1939, transited across France, and arrived in Palestine on 9 January 1940.  It served as a garrison force under British Forces, Palestine and Trans-Jordan.

On 1 August 1941, the Division was converted into the 10th Armoured Division and the 6th Cavalry Brigade into the 8th Armoured Brigade.  8th Armoured Brigade would later take part in the Second Battle of El Alamein and land at Gold Beach on D Day.

Order of battle
Unlike in the First World War, when brigade compositions rarely changed, there was considerable movement of units between the 4th, 5th and 6th Cavalry Brigades in the Second World War.

Of the three regiments with the brigade when it was converted to an armoured formation:
the Royal Scots Greys converted into an Armoured Regiment in 8th Armoured Brigade. 
the Yorkshire Hussars converted into an Armoured Regiment in 9th Armoured Brigade (former 4th Cavalry Brigade).  It remained in the Middle East until 1943 when it returned to the UK. 
the Staffordshire Yeomanry converted into an Armoured Regiment in 8th Armoured Brigade.  It fought in the Second Battle of El Alamein before returning to England.  It landed in Normandy on D Day (6 June 1944) and fought throughout the North West Europe Campaign.

Commanders
The 6th Cavalry Brigade had the following commanders during the First World War:

The 6th Cavalry Brigade had the following commanders during the Second World War:

See also

 Order of battle of the Waterloo Campaign
 British Army during World War I
 British Cavalry Corps order of battle 1914
 British cavalry during the First World War
 British Army Order of Battle (September 1939)
 List of British brigades of the Second World War

Notes

References

Bibliography

External links
 
 
 

6
Military units and formations established in 1815
Military units and formations disestablished in 1815
Military units and formations established in 1914
Military units and formations disestablished in 1919
Military units and formations established in 1920
1920 establishments in the United Kingdom
Military units and formations disestablished in 1941
1815 establishments in the United Kingdom